George Herbert Smith was an American educator.  He was the 16th and longest serving president of Willamette University in Salem, Oregon, from 1942-1969.  Smith graduated from DePauw University in 1927 where he was a member of  Beta Theta Pi Fraternity. Smith served as General Secretary of Beta Theta Pi from 1935–1946 and President of that organization from 1946-1951.  Smith is also the original author of The Son of the Stars, the Beta Theta Pi pledge manual.

During Smith's tenure as president of Willamette University, he was instrumental in bringing international fraternities and sororities to that campus where only local organizations had previously existed.  In 1947, he assisted in the installation of Beta Theta Pi, Phi Delta Theta, and Sigma Chi at Willamette University, the first time the Miami Triad had ever been installed on the same campus at the same time.  This was also during Smith's second year as president of the General Fraternity of Beta Theta Pi.

Smith served as National President of Omicron Delta Kappa from 1961-64. He received ODK's Meritorious Service Award in 1964 and its Distinguished Service Key in 1966.

The G. Herbert Smith Auditorium and Fine Arts Center on Willamette's campus is named after Smith.

References

Year of birth missing
Year of death missing
Presidents of Willamette University
DePauw University alumni